Daxton Jor-El Hill (born September 29, 2000) is an American football safety for the Cincinnati Bengals of the National Football League (NFL). He played college football at Michigan and was drafted by the Bengals in the first round of the 2022 NFL Draft.

High school career
Hill attended Booker T. Washington High School in Tulsa, Oklahoma. As a senior in 2019, he was the Gatorade Football Player of the Year for Oklahoma. He played in the 2019 U.S. Army All-American Game. A five star recruit, he committed to play college football at the University of Michigan before switching to the University of Alabama and then back to Michigan.

College career
As a true freshman at Michigan in 2019, Hill played in 13 games with three starts and had 36 tackles and one interception. As a sophomore in 2020, he started six games, recording 46 tackles and one interception. He returned to Michigan as a starter in 2021 and received first-team all conference honors. Hill declared for the 2022 NFL Draft following the 2021 season.

Professional career

Hill was drafted by the Cincinnati Bengals in the first round (31st overall) of the 2022 NFL Draft.

Personal life
Hill's middle name Jor-El was taken from the comic book character of the same name. His brother, Justice Hill, played running back for the Oklahoma State Cowboys and was drafted by the Baltimore Ravens in the fourth round of the 2019 NFL Draft.

References

External links
 Cincinnati Bengals bio
Michigan Wolverines bio

2000 births
Living people
Sportspeople from Tulsa, Oklahoma
Players of American football from Oklahoma
American football safeties
American football cornerbacks
Michigan Wolverines football players
Cincinnati Bengals players